Jamie McDonald (born 13 January 1977) is an Australian former professional rugby league footballer who played in the 1990s and 2000s. He played for the Adelaide Rams in 1998, the North Queensland Cowboys from 2000–04 and finally the Melbourne Storm in 2005.

Playing career
In 1998, McDonald played for the Wests Panthers in the Queensland Cup.
McDonald made 2 appearances for the now defunct Adelaide side in 1998 including the club's final ever game which was a 34-20 loss against Newcastle.

After the liquidation of Adelaide, McDonald joined North Queensland.  In McDonald's first season at the club, North Queensland finished last on the table.  In total, McDonald made 48 appearances for the team.  McDonald also scored his one and only try in first grade in Round 20 2003 against Canterbury while at the club.

In 2005, McDonald joined Melbourne and his final game in first grade was a 36-16 loss against Penrith.

References

External links
http://www.rugbyleagueproject.org/players/Jamie_McDonald/summary.html

1977 births
Living people
Adelaide Rams players
Australian rugby league players
Melbourne Storm players
North Queensland Cowboys players
Rugby league players from Tweed Heads, New South Wales
Rugby league props
Toulouse Olympique players
Wests Panthers players